"Always on My Mind" is a ballad written by Wayne Carson, Johnny Christopher, and Mark James, first recorded by Brenda Lee, and first released by Gwen McCrae (as "You Were Always on My Mind") in March 1972. Lee's version was released three months later in June 1972. The song has been a crossover hit, charting in both the country and western and pop categories. Elvis Presley's recording was the first hit version of the song.

AllMusic lists more than 300 recorded releases of the song in versions by dozens of performers. While Lee's version reached no. 45 on the US country chart in 1972, other performers reached the Top 20 on the country and/or pop charts in the United States and elsewhere with their own versions: Elvis Presley (1972, US country; UK pop Top Ten); John Wesley Ryles (1979, US country) and Willie Nelson's Grammy Award-winning version (1982, US/Canada country number one; US/Canada pop Top Ten). Plus the Pet Shop Boys' 1987 hi-NRG/synth-pop interpretation (UK number one; US Top Ten).

Background and composition
"Always on My Mind" did not see completion until late 1971. Songwriter-guitarist Wayne Carson had about two verses done, with the working title "You Were Always on My Mind". He had been occupied in Memphis on a project that required him to stay ten days longer, and he phoned his wife in Springfield, Missouri, to apologize for the delay. She was angry, and he replied: "Well, I know I’ve been gone a lot, but I’ve been thinking about you all the time." This idea struck him as potential song material, and he quickly ended the call so he could capture it on paper. He brought the song back to the recording studio of Chips Moman and worked on it for a few days, but it did not jell. Carson asked for help from his colleague Johnny Christopher (the two had already written the hit song "No Love at All" in 1970) and they composed more of it in Moman's office. Feeling stuck, they appealed for assistance from songwriter Mark James who was walking through the studio. James was exhausted from non-stop music projects but he ran through the song with Carson and Christopher. By the fourth run-through, the song was finished.

Music critic Robert Hilburn said that it was commonly thought in Nashville and Memphis that Elvis Presley's marital troubles were the inspiration of the song, and that it was tailored to fit his musical style. Fueling this conjecture was the fact that James had already written a hit song "Suspicious Minds" for Presley. Carson responded that the song was not written for Presley but for every man. He said that it "was one long apology. It’s sort of like all guys who screw up and would love nothing better than to pick up the phone and call their wives and say, 'Listen, honey, I could have done better, but I want you to know that you were always on my mind.

Elvis Presley version

Elvis Presley recorded "Always on My Mind" on March 29, 1972, a few weeks after his February separation from his wife, Priscilla. The song was popular and critically appreciated and is considered one of Presley's standout songs of the 1970s. The song was released as the B-side of the "Separate Ways" single, which was certified gold by the Recording Industry Association of America (RIAA) for sales in excess of one million units. It was listed as a double A-side, reaching number 16 on Billboards Hot Country Singles chart in November 1972. In the United Kingdom, "Always on My Mind" (as the A-side) reached the Top Ten in January 1973. In 2013 the recording ranked number one in a poll conducted by ITV, "The Nation's Favourite Elvis Songs", just ahead of "Suspicious Minds" and "Can't Help Falling in Love".

Charts

Certifications

John Wesley Ryles version

In 1979, John Wesley Ryles reached number 20 on the US Hot Country Songs chart with his rendition, retitled "You Are Always on My Mind", from the album Let the Night Begin. The rendition was produced by Bob Montgomery.

A review in Billboard praised the "brightly mixed vocals" and "powerful production".

Charts

Willie Nelson version

Willie Nelson recorded and released the song in early 1982. It raced to number one on Billboards Hot Country Singles chart that May, spending two weeks on top and a total of 21 weeks on the chart. The song also fared well on Top 40 radio, reaching number five on the Billboard Hot 100 for three weeks and staying on that chart for 23 weeks. It was the best-performing single on the Hot Country Singles year-end chart of 1982. This version also charted in a number of other countries. The single was certified platinum by the RIAA on October 7, 1991.

Nelson's version resulted in three wins at the 25th Grammy Awards in February 1983: songwriters Christopher, James, and Carson won Song of the Year and Best Country Song; in addition, Nelson won for Best Male Country Vocal Performance. This version also won Country Music Association Awards in two consecutive years: 1982 Song of the Year and 1983 Song of the Year for songwriters Christopher, James and Carson; 1982 Single of the Year for Nelson; and contributed to Nelson winning 1982 Album of the Year for the album Always on My Mind.

Nelson performed the song with Johnny Cash on the 1998 release of VH1 Storytellers: Johnny Cash & Willie Nelson. The song was also featured in a December 2009 ASPCA commercial. In 2008, the song was inducted into the Grammy Hall of Fame.

In 2013, Nelson's version was also featured in its entirety in a season two episode of the HBO series The Newsroom.

Charts

Weekly charts

Year-end charts

Certifications

Pet Shop Boys version

In 1987, the Pet Shop Boys performed a synth-pop version of "Always on My Mind" on Love Me Tender, a television special on ITV in the United Kingdom. Commemorating the tenth anniversary of Presley's death, the programme featured various popular acts of the time performing cover versions of his songs. The Pet Shop Boys' performance was so well-received that the duo decided to record the song and release it as a single.

This hi-NRG and dance-pop version became the UK's Christmas number-one single that year – edging out "Fairytale of New York" by the Pogues – spending four weeks atop the chart. It also reached number four on the US Billboard Hot 100, becoming their fifth and last top ten hit.

The Pet Shop Boys version introduces a harmonic variation not present in the original version. In the original, the ending phrase "always on my mind" is sung to a IV-V7-I cadence (C-D7-G). The Pet Shop Boys extend this cadence by adding two further chords: C-D7-Gm7/B-C-G (i.e. a progression of IV-V7-IIIb-IV-I).

In November 2004, The Daily Telegraph placed the version at number two in a list of the 50 best cover versions of all time. In October 2014, a public poll compiled by the BBC saw the song voted the all-time best cover version.

In the video for Pet Shop Boys' version of "Always on My Mind" (an excerpt from their surreal music film It Couldn't Happen Here), Neil Tennant and Chris Lowe are seated in the front of a taxi cab, when an eccentric passenger gets in, played by British actor Joss Ackland. At the end of the song, he gets out of the car, which drives away. Standing alone, he mutters: "You went away. It should make me feel better. But I don't know how I'm going to get through", which is part of the lyrics for another Pet Shop Boys song, "What Have I Done to Deserve This?", released earlier in the year.

In 1988, the duo remixed the song for their third studio album, Introspective, combining it with the acid house track "In My House". Two further remixes by longtime Pet Shop Boys remixer, Shep Pettibone, were released on the US promotional triple vinyl version of the album—Shep's Holiday Mix and Shep's House Mix. Neither have appeared on any other format since.

In 2008, the song was used in the video game Dance Dance Revolution X, which was released for both arcades and the PlayStation 2 console. In 2010, the song was re-used for Dance Dance Revolution X2 which was released for arcades.

In 2017, Burberry released its holiday campaign, as directed by Alasdair McLellan, which features Cara Delevingne and actor Matt Smith. It opens with Delevingne singing "Always on My Mind" before segueing into the Pet Shop Boys cover of the song.

Charts

Weekly charts

Year-end charts

Certifications

References

Bibliography

 

1971 songs
1972 singles
1973 singles
1982 singles
1987 singles
Amanda Lear songs
Billboard Hot Country Songs number-one singles of the year
Brenda Lee songs
Christmas number-one singles in the United Kingdom
Columbia Records singles
Country ballads
Decca Records singles
Elvis Presley songs
European Hot 100 Singles number-one singles
Grammy Award for Song of the Year
Grammy Hall of Fame Award recipients
John Wesley Ryles songs
MCA Records singles
Number-one singles in Finland
Number-one singles in Germany
Number-one singles in Spain
Number-one singles in Sweden
Number-one singles in Switzerland
Parlophone singles
Pet Shop Boys songs
RCA Victor singles
RPM Top Singles number-one singles
Song recordings produced by Bob Montgomery (songwriter)
Song recordings produced by Chips Moman
Song recordings produced by Felton Jarvis
Song recordings produced by Julian Mendelsohn
Song recordings produced by Owen Bradley
Songs about nostalgia
Songs written by Mark James (songwriter)
Songs written by Wayne Carson
UK Singles Chart number-one singles
Willie Nelson songs
1970s ballads